Peter DiPilato (born June 14, 1976) is an American entertainment photographer. He is best known for his riveting footage on 9/11 which was featured in the documentary film 7 Days in September; directed by Steven Rosenbaum. He also appeared on the first season of the reality show Shipmates.

Education 
He attended Xavier High School in Manhattan and earned a B.S. in Advertising and Marketing Communications at the Fashion Institute of Technology.

Awards 

DiPilato was the Grand Prize winner for the Oakland Raiders in the 2013 NFL Back to Football Photo Day Contest sponsored by New Era Cap Company.

Filmography

References

External links 
Official Website
 

1976 births
Living people
Fashion Institute of Technology alumni
American photographers